= George H. Budweiser =

American politician

Member of the South Dakota House of Representatives
- In office 1913–1913

Personal details
- Born: August 20, 1880 East St. Louis, Illinois, U.S.
- Died: June 2, 1957 (aged 76) Puyallup, Washington, U.S.
- Spouse: Mabel Budweiser

George H. Budweiser (August 20, 1880 – June 2, 1957) was an American politician. He served as a member of the South Dakota House of Representatives.

== Life and career ==
Budweiser was born in East St. Louis, Illinois. In 1913, Budweiser was elected to the South Dakota House of Representatives. Budweiser died on June 2, 1957 in Puyallup, Washington, at the age of 76.
